Listed below are the UCI Women's Teams that competed in 2007 women's road cycling events organized by the International Cycling Union (UCI) including the 2007 UCI Women's Road World Cup.

Teams overview

Riders

A.S. Team F.R.W

Ages as of 1 January 2007.

Cheerwine

Ages as of 1 January 2007.

Colavita/Sutter Home Presented By Cooking Light

Ages as of 1 January 2007.

Lotto–Belisol Ladiesteam

Kim Schoonbaert (BEL)
Elise Depoorter (BEL)
Liesbet De Vocht (BEL)
Catherine Delfosse (BEL) (in from Team Massi Abarth (MTB))
Lieselot Decroix (BEL) (in from Velo Bella)
Martine Bras (NED) (in from Moving Ladies)
Corine Hierckens (BEL) (in from AA Drink)
Grace Verbeken (BEL)
Sara Carrigan (AUS)
Siobhan Dervan (IRL)
Tamara Boyd (NZL) (in from Les Pruneaux d'Agen)
Yolandi Du Toit (RSA) (in from Team FBUK)
Kathy Watt (AUS)
Sofie De Vuyst (BEL)
Jurrina Duprez (BEL)
Annelies Van Doorslaer (BEL)
Laura Van Geyt (BEL)
Nana Steenssens (NED)
Ine Beyen (BEL)
Lien Beyen (BEL)
Denise D'Hamecourt (BEL)
Jenifer De Merlier (BEL)
Kelly Druyts (BEL)
Evi Verstraete (BEL)
Lien Lanssens (BEL)
Arien Torsius (RSA)
Natalia Llaca (MEX)

Rapha/Condor

Ages as of 1 January 2007.

Saccarelli Emu Sea Marsciano

Ages as of 1 January 2007.

Team Expresscopy.com

Ages as of 1 January 2007.

Team Flexpoint

 Mirjam Melchers (Ned)
 Susanne Ljungskog (Swe)
 Amber Neben (USA)
 Loes Gunnewijk (Ned)
 Mie Lacota (Den)
 Luise Keller (Ger)
 Moniek Kleinsman (Ned)
 Loes Markerink (Ned)
 Madeleine Sandig (Ger)
 Trine Schmidt (Den)
 Iris Slappendel (Ned)
 Susanne van Veen (Ned)

Team Getränke-Hoffmann

Ages as of 1 January 2007.

Team Lipton

Ages as of 1 January 2007.

Therme Skin Care

Ages as of 1 January 2007.

T-Mobile Women

Ages as of 1 January 2007.

Source

Valencian Community

Ages as of 1 January 2007.

Vrienden van het Platteland

Ages as of 1 January 2007.

Sources

References

2007 in women's road cycling
2007